The 1989–90 New York Rangers season was the franchise's 64th season. During the regular season, the Rangers led the Patrick Division with 85 points and qualified for the NHL playoffs. In the first round of the playoffs, the Rangers defeated the New York Islanders four games to one and earned a berth in the Patrick Division Finals. There, New York lost to the Washington Capitals in five games.

Offseason
During the offseason, Gulf+Western, owners of the Rangers, and all MSG properties since 1977, changed their name to Paramount Communications. The new name was chosen in honor of the company's leading subsidiary, the Paramount Pictures film studio.

Regular season

The Rangers finished the regular season with the most power-play opportunities (442) and the most power-play goals scored (103).

Final standings

Schedule and results

|- align="center" bgcolor="#CCFFCC"
| 1 || 6 || @ Winnipeg Jets || 4–1 || 1–0–0
|- align="center" bgcolor="#CCFFCC"
| 2 || 8 || @ Chicago Blackhawks || 5–3 || 2–0–0
|- align="center" bgcolor="#CCFFCC"
| 3 || 11 || Calgary Flames || 5–4 || 3–0–0
|- align="center" bgcolor="#FFBBBB"
| 4 || 13 || @ Washington Capitals || 7–4 || 3–1–0
|- align="center" bgcolor="#CCFFCC"
| 5 || 15 || Pittsburgh Penguins || 4–2 || 4–1–0
|- align="center" bgcolor="white"
| 6 || 17 || Chicago Blackhawks || 3 – 3 OT || 4–1–1
|- align="center" bgcolor="#CCFFCC"
| 7 || 19 || Hartford Whalers || 7–3 || 5–1–1
|- align="center" bgcolor="#CCFFCC"
| 8 || 21 || @ Philadelphia Flyers || 3–1 || 6–1–1
|- align="center" bgcolor="#CCFFCC"
| 9 || 23 || Vancouver Canucks || 5–3 || 7–1–1
|- align="center" bgcolor="white"
| 10 || 25 || Edmonton Oilers || 3 – 3 OT || 7–1–2
|- align="center" bgcolor="white"
| 11 || 27 || New York Islanders || 5 – 5 OT || 7–1–3
|- align="center" bgcolor="#CCFFCC"
| 12 || 28 || @ New York Islanders || 4–1 || 8–1–3
|- align="center" bgcolor="#FFBBBB"
| 13 || 30 || Philadelphia Flyers || 3–1 || 8–2–3
|-

|- align="center" bgcolor="#CCFFCC"
| 14 || 2 || Quebec Nordiques || 6–1 || 9–2–3
|- align="center" bgcolor="#FFBBBB"
| 15 || 4 || @ Montreal Canadiens || 3–2 || 9–3–3
|- align="center" bgcolor="#CCFFCC"
| 16 || 6 || Detroit Red Wings || 6–1 || 10–3–3
|- align="center" bgcolor="#FFBBBB"
| 17 || 8 || Montreal Canadiens || 3–2 || 10–4–3
|- align="center" bgcolor="#CCFFCC"
| 18 || 12 || New York Islanders || 4–2 || 11–4–3
|- align="center" bgcolor="#FFBBBB"
| 19 || 14 || @ Pittsburgh Penguins || 6–0 || 11–5–3
|- align="center" bgcolor="#FFBBBB"
| 20 || 17 || @ New Jersey Devils || 5 – 4 OT || 11–6–3
|- align="center" bgcolor="#CCFFCC"
| 21 || 18 || @ Hartford Whalers || 3–2 || 12–6–3
|- align="center" bgcolor="white"
| 22 || 20 || Winnipeg Jets || 3 – 3 OT || 12–6–4
|- align="center" bgcolor="#FFBBBB"
| 23 || 22 || @ Buffalo Sabres || 4–1 || 12–7–4
|- align="center" bgcolor="#FFBBBB"
| 24 || 25 || @ Toronto Maple Leafs || 7–4 || 12–8–4
|- align="center" bgcolor="#CCFFCC"
| 25 || 26 || Quebec Nordiques || 3–1 || 13–8–4
|- align="center" bgcolor="#FFBBBB"
| 26 || 29 || @ Winnipeg Jets || 5–4 || 13–9–4
|-

|- align="center" bgcolor="#CCFFCC"
| 27 || 1 || @ Vancouver Canucks || 4–3 || 14–9–4
|- align="center" bgcolor="#FFBBBB"
| 28 || 2 || @ Los Angeles Kings || 6–0 || 14–10–4
|- align="center" bgcolor="#CCFFCC"
| 29 || 6 || New Jersey Devils || 5–3 || 15–10–4
|- align="center" bgcolor="white"
| 30 || 9 || @ New York Islanders || 0 – 0 OT || 15–10–5
|- align="center" bgcolor="#FFBBBB"
| 31 || 10 || Philadelphia Flyers || 4–2 || 15–11–5
|- align="center" bgcolor="#FFBBBB"
| 32 || 13 || St. Louis Blues || 3–1 || 15–12–5
|- align="center" bgcolor="#FFBBBB"
| 33 || 16 || @ New York Islanders || 4–3 || 15–13–5
|- align="center" bgcolor="#FFBBBB"
| 34 || 17 || Montreal Canadiens || 2–0 || 15–14–5
|- align="center" bgcolor="white"
| 35 || 20 || Buffalo Sabres || 2 – 2 OT || 15–14–6
|- align="center" bgcolor="#FFBBBB"
| 36 || 23 || @ Washington Capitals || 3–2 || 15–15–6
|- align="center" bgcolor="white"
| 37 || 26 || New Jersey Devils || 4 – 4 OT || 15–15–7
|- align="center" bgcolor="#FFBBBB"
| 38 || 27 || @ Pittsburgh Penguins || 7–4 || 15–16–7
|- align="center" bgcolor="#FFBBBB"
| 39 || 29 || @ New Jersey Devils || 3–2 || 15–17–7
|- align="center" bgcolor="#FFBBBB"
| 40 || 31 || Pittsburgh Penguins || 5–4 || 15–18–7
|-

|- align="center" bgcolor="#CCFFCC"
| 41 || 3 || Washington Capitals || 2–1 || 16–18–7
|- align="center" bgcolor="#FFBBBB"
| 42 || 4 || @ Minnesota North Stars || 8–2 || 16–19–7
|- align="center" bgcolor="#FFBBBB"
| 43 || 6 || @ St. Louis Blues || 4–3 || 16–20–7
|- align="center" bgcolor="#FFBBBB"
| 44 || 8 || Pittsburgh Penguins || 7–5 || 16–21–7
|- align="center" bgcolor="white"
| 45 || 10 || Chicago Blackhawks || 2 – 2 OT || 16–21–8
|- align="center" bgcolor="#CCFFCC"
| 46 || 13 || @ Boston Bruins || 3–2 || 17–21–8
|- align="center" bgcolor="#CCFFCC"
| 47 || 14 || Philadelphia Flyers || 4 – 3 OT || 18–21–8
|- align="center" bgcolor="white"
| 48 || 18 || @ Pittsburgh Penguins || 3 – 3 OT || 18–21–9
|- align="center" bgcolor="#CCFFCC"
| 49 || 23 || @ Edmonton Oilers || 4–3 || 19–21–9
|- align="center" bgcolor="#FFBBBB"
| 50 || 25 || @ Calgary Flames || 8–5 || 19–22–9
|- align="center" bgcolor="#CCFFCC"
| 51 || 27 || @ Los Angeles Kings || 3–1 || 20–22–9
|- align="center" bgcolor="white"
| 52 || 31 || St. Louis Blues || 2 – 2 OT || 20–22–10
|-

|- align="center" bgcolor="#CCFFCC"
| 53 || 3 || @ Boston Bruins || 2–1 || 21–22–10
|- align="center" bgcolor="#CCFFCC"
| 54 || 4 || Minnesota North Stars || 4–3 || 22–22–10
|- align="center" bgcolor="#CCFFCC"
| 55 || 7 || Edmonton Oilers || 5–2 || 23–22–10
|- align="center" bgcolor="#FFBBBB"
| 56 || 9 || @ Buffalo Sabres || 3–2 || 23–23–10
|- align="center" bgcolor="#FFBBBB"
| 57 || 11 || Calgary Flames || 5–2 || 23–24–10
|- align="center" bgcolor="#CCFFCC"
| 58 || 13 || @ Philadelphia Flyers || 4–3 || 24–24–10
|- align="center" bgcolor="#FFBBBB"
| 59 || 14 || Pittsburgh Penguins || 4 – 3 OT || 24–25–10
|- align="center" bgcolor="#CCFFCC"
| 60 || 16 || @ New Jersey Devils || 2–1 || 25–25–10
|- align="center" bgcolor="#CCFFCC"
| 61 || 19 || New Jersey Devils || 4 – 3 OT || 26–25–10
|- align="center" bgcolor="white"
| 62 || 21 || @ Detroit Red Wings || 4 – 4 OT || 26–25–11
|- align="center" bgcolor="#CCFFCC"
| 63 || 23 || @ Washington Capitals || 6–3 || 27–25–11
|- align="center" bgcolor="#CCFFCC"
| 64 || 26 || Boston Bruins || 6–1 || 28–25–11
|- align="center" bgcolor="#CCFFCC"
| 65 || 28 || Washington Capitals || 3–2 || 29–25–11
|-

|- align="center" bgcolor="#CCFFCC"
| 66 || 2 || New York Islanders || 6–3 || 30–25–11
|- align="center" bgcolor="#FFBBBB"
| 67 || 3 || @ Hartford Whalers || 6–4 || 30–26–11
|- align="center" bgcolor="#CCFFCC"
| 68 || 5 || Detroit Red Wings || 3–2 || 31–26–11
|- align="center" bgcolor="#CCFFCC"
| 69 || 8 || @ Philadelphia Flyers || 7–5 || 32–26–11
|- align="center" bgcolor="white"
| 70 || 10 || @ Minnesota North Stars || 2 – 2 OT || 32–26–12
|- align="center" bgcolor="#FFBBBB"
| 71 || 12 || Los Angeles Kings || 6–2 || 32–27–12
|- align="center" bgcolor="#CCFFCC"
| 72 || 14 || @ Toronto Maple Leafs || 8–2 || 33–27–12
|- align="center" bgcolor="#FFBBBB"
| 73 || 17 || @ New York Islanders || 6–3 || 33–28–12
|- align="center" bgcolor="#CCFFCC"
| 74 || 18 || Vancouver Canucks || 5–2 || 34–28–12
|- align="center" bgcolor="white"
| 75 || 21 || Toronto Maple Leafs || 5 – 5 OT || 34–28–13
|- align="center" bgcolor="#CCFFCC"
| 76 || 25 || Philadelphia Flyers || 7–3 || 35–28–13
|- align="center" bgcolor="#CCFFCC"
| 77 || 27 || @ Quebec Nordiques || 7–4 || 36–28–13
|- align="center" bgcolor="#FFBBBB"
| 78 || 29 || @ New Jersey Devils || 6–4 || 36–29–13
|- align="center" bgcolor="#FFBBBB"
| 79 || 31 || @ Washington Capitals || 2–1 || 36–30–13
|-

|- align="center" bgcolor="#FFBBBB"
| 80 || 1 || Washington Capitals || 3–2 || 36–31–13
|-

Playoffs

Key:  Win  Loss

Player statistics
Skaters

Goaltenders

†Denotes player spent time with another team before joining Rangers. Stats reflect time with Rangers only.
‡Traded mid-season. Stats reflect time with Rangers only.

Awards and records

Transactions
 September 1, 1989: the Rangers traded Barry Beck to the Los Angeles Kings for future considerations.
 September 7, 1989: the Rangers traded Chris McRae and a 5th round draft pick in 1990 to the Detroit Red Wings for Kris King.
 September 14, 1989: the Rangers acquired Lee Giffin from the Pittsburgh Penguins for future considerations.
 October 5, 1989: the Rangers traded Michel Petit to the Quebec Nordiques for Randy Moller.
 November 1, 1989: the Rangers traded Jayson More to the Minnesota North Stars for Dave Archibald.
 January 20, 1990: the Rangers traded Tomas Sandstrom and Tony Granato to the Los Angeles Kings for Bernie Nicholls.
 March 6, 1990: the Rangers traded Ulf Dahlen, a 4th round draft pick in 1990, and future considerations (a 4th round draft pick in 1991) to the Minnesota North Stars for Mike Gartner.

Draft picks
New York's picks at the 1989 NHL Entry Draft in Bloomington, Minnesota at the Met Center.

Supplemental Draft
New York's picks at the 1989 NHL Supplemental Draft.

Farm teams

References

New York Rangers seasons
New York Rangers
New York Rangers
New York Rangers
New York Rangers
1980s in Manhattan
1990s in Manhattan
Madison Square Garden
Patrick Division champion seasons